The Hominy School, constructed in 1904, is 50 feet x 40 feet, and 20 feet high. The bell tower was removed in the 1940s, but replaced in 1980 with the original bell. It was the first and oldest school in Hominy.

References

Buildings and structures in Osage County, Oklahoma
School buildings on the National Register of Historic Places in Oklahoma
Hominy, Oklahoma
National Register of Historic Places in Osage County, Oklahoma